Victor Mikhailovich Oreshnikov (January 7 (O.S. January 20), 1904, Perm – March 15, 1987, Leningrad) was a Soviet Russian painter, People's Artist of the USSR, active member of the Soviet Academy of Arts (1954–1987), Stalin Prize winner, rector of Repin Institute of Arts (1953–1978).

Biography 
In 1927 he graduated from the Leningrad VHUTEIN in workshop of Kuzma Petrov-Vodkin. In 1930-1987 he taught in the Repin Institute of Arts. PhD in Art History (1937). Doctor of Fine Arts (1948). Victor Oreshnikov was twice awarded the Stalin Prize (1948, 1950), Order of Lenin, Order of the Red Banner of Labour, Order of the Badge of Honour, and numerous medals. Solo exhibitions of the artist was held in Leningrad (1954, 1974, 1985) and Moscow (1975).

Pupils 
 Irina Getmanskaya
 Boris Korneev
 Alexander Koroviakov
 Elena Kostenko
 Victor Otiev
 Nikolai Pozdneev
 Maria Rudnitskaya
 Alexander Sokolov
 Rostislav Vovkushevsky

Sources 
 Выставка произведений ленинградских художников. 1947 год. Живопись. Скульптура. Графика. Театрально-декорационная живопись. Каталог. Л., ЛССХ, 1948.
 Бойков В. Изобразительное искусство Ленинграда. Заметки о выставке ленинградских художников. // Ленинградская правда, 1947, 29 ноября.
 Аникушин М. О времени и о себе. // Вечерний Ленинград, 1967, 17 октября.
 Изобразительное искусство Ленинграда. Каталог выставки. — Л: Художник РСФСР, 1976. — с.25,40.
 Выставка произведений ленинградских художников, посвященная 60-летию Великого Октября. — Л: Художник РСФСР, 1982. — с.18.
 Виктор Михайлович Орешников. Каталог выставки. Живопись. М: Изобразительное искусство, 1985.
 L' École de Leningrad. Auction Catalogue. - Paris: Drouot Richelieu, 12 Mars 1990. - p. 100-101.
 L' École de Leningrad. Auction Catalogue. - Paris: Drouot Richelieu, 11 Juin 1990. - p. 60-61.
 Sergei V. Ivanov. Unknown Socialist Realism. The Leningrad School. Saint Petersburg: NP-Print Edition, 2007.  P.9, 15, 19, 356, 358, 359, 362, 367–371, 383–385, 387–392, 396, 398, 399, 402, 406, 441, 443, 444. , .

External links 

1904 births
1987 deaths
20th-century Russian painters
Russian male painters
People's Artists of the USSR (visual arts)
Full Members of the USSR Academy of Arts
Stalin Prize winners
Soviet painters
Members of the Leningrad Union of Artists
Socialist realist artists
Leningrad School artists
Repin Institute of Arts alumni
Russian portrait painters